Etawah also known as Ishtikapuri is a city on the banks of Yamuna River in the state of Western Uttar Pradesh in India. It is the administrative headquarters of Etawah District. Etawah's population of 256,838 (as per 2011 population census) makes it the one hundred and eightieth-most populous city in India.

Etawah is about 120 km east of Agra and is about 140 km west of Kanpur. The city was an important centre for the Indian Rebellion of 1857. It is also the  sangam or confluence of the Yamuna and Chambal rivers. It is the 26th most populous city in Uttar Pradesh.

Demographics

As per the 2011 census, Etawah city had a population of 256,790, of which males were 135,829, and females were 120,961 - an increase of 22% from 211,460 in 2001 census. (The entire Etawah district had a population of 1,581,810 in 2011.) The literacy rate was 82.89 per cent.
Hinduism is majority religion in Etawah city with 74.64% followers. Islam is second most popular religion in city of Etawah with approximately 23.61% following it. In Etawah city, Christinity is followed by 0.19%, Jainism by 1.05%, Sikhism by 0.24% and Buddhism by 0.24%. Around 0.01% stated 'Other Religion', approximately 0.19% stated 'No Particular Religion'.

Main spoken languages are Hindi (98.20%), Urdu (1.75%), Sindhi (0.01%)

Total no. of Slums in Etawah city numbers 5,528 in which population of 33,188 resides. This is around 12.92% of total population of Etawah city.

Name
During Rajput era the king of Chauhan dynasty Sumershah had gone to the bank of the Yamuna river in Etawah, where he saw an incredible act of nature. He saw a goat and a wolf drinking water together on the bank of the Yamuna. After seeing this incident, the king went to astrologers and consulted about the incident, who advised him to build a fort at the place where the wolf and the goat were drinking water together. According to astrological calculation, building a fort would benefit the king.When construction work of the fort started at the decided location, then, while digging foundation the laborers working there found a brick of gold and silver, which made them excited and they started shouting "Eeet Mili, Eeet Mili" after hearing which the place was named as "Eeet Aaya" which later turned into ‘Etawah’.

Etawah is still sometimes referred to as the city of bricks and both tradition and the appearance of the ground suggest that the modern city was founded on an ancient Khera or town site, so that it is not improbable that the existence of old bricks or old brick kilns may have led to its present name. According to some scholars the region from Bateshwar in district Agra to Bhareh was known as ‘Ishtapath’ and there are a large number of temples of Lord Siva who was ‘Isht Dev’ of the people of that region. From the word ‘Isht’ the town was given the name of Ishtkapuri a reference to which is found in Bhareshya Puran.

History

Ancient era

It is believed that the land existed right from the Bronze Age in the medieval times. It once formed part of the ancient country of Panchala which is said to have extended from the foot of the Himalayas in the north to the river Chambal in the south. This region rose into great prominence during the period of Mahabharata. Many local traditions are attached to the modern Chakar Nagar which is a tehsil nearby which most probably seems to be Ekchakra mentioned in Mahabharata. It was Ekchakra where Pandavas along with their mother Kunti spent their secret abode of one year during the period of their exile. There is a belief that the city was founded by King Bharat. During the fourth century A.D., Guptas once again established imperial unity in India. The Chinees traveler Fa-Hien also visited a city named ‘A-lo i.e. Alvi, which has been identified with modern Airwa nearly town, and spent his treat at the Dragon Shrine. Fa-Hien described it as "a city near a large forest" (atavi). There are the remains of Buddhist and Jain temples evidently of every ancient date in large number. In the ninth and tenth centuries, this region was under the rule of Gurjara Pratihara rulers. The conquest of Kannauj by Nagabhata II handed Pratiharas control over this region. But the place was said to be evolved as an affluent region under Mihir Bhoj, the Pratihara King.

With the coronation of Harsha as a king (in 606 AD) the city  came under the Thaneshwar dynasty. Hiuen Tsang in his works has also dwelt upon the prosperity of this region.

Medieval Era
The defeat of Jaichandra of Kannauj in the Battle of Chandawar in 1193 A.D at the hands of Shahab-ud-din Ghori, the city passed under influence of Muslim power, which by end of the century held in different degrees of subjection the whole of North India except Malwa and some contiguous districts. Muslim rule in Etawah faced Maratha invasion for short period within their rule in Etawah. However, the local history of the city during the early years of the thirteenth century is more or less the account of the settlement and emergence of certain Rajput clans. The Gaurs occupied part of Phaphund and Bidhuna near the Kanpur boundary, both falling in turn to Chandelas of Mahoba. The Chauhans occupied the western portion of the district, with extensive tracts now in Mainpuri. During this period; however, some disturbance related to tax arouse in Nasir-ud-din Muhammad Shah's rule, yet these issues were put to end by Tomar ruler of Gwalior in 1390. In 1400–1401 Mallu Iqbal Khan marched towards this region and was opposed by Rai Sumar Singh or Sabir of Etawah and other Zamindars of the vicinity on the banks of the Ab-i-Siyah (Kali Nadi) near Patiali. The opposing army of Rai was defeated and chased down to the confines of Etawah where they took shelter.

Etawah was associated with various important historical events like Jaunpur Campaign, reigns of  rulers like Bahlul Lodi, Ibrahim Lodi, Babur, Humayun and Akbar. In the fourth year of Akbar's reign, Bahadur Khan a younger brother of Ali Quli Khan was granted the jagir of Etawah at the instance of Maham Anka, the foster mother of the Emperor. After this, Etawah district underwent major changes during reign of Rohillas and the Oudh Government.

Colonial Era
The cession on November 10, 1801, the city was made over to the British Government by the Nawab Saadat Ali Khan together with the rest of the lower Doab and other tracts. This action was taken in return for a guarantee of protection, and by way of payment for the maintenance of the Oadh local forces which were ultimately stationed at Kanpur. Still for some years Etawah was threatened with Maratha inroads, while scenes occurred with the zamindars in the earlier years of the British administration which recall the experiences of the imperial officers in the 16th century, and it was not until the zamindars of Saudaus, Sahson and Kamait had been finally settled with in 1816 A.D.

Mutiny of 1857
On December 25, 1857, a British Column arrived in the city. Kunwar Johar Singh now surrounded and blew up the Etawah tahsil building from where Taj Khan, was resisting the British advance. On 6 January 1858 the British reoccupied Etawah, but struggle was hardly crushed.

Freedom Struggle
In 1907 rumours were afloated in Etawah that Zorawar Singh Nigam, had organized a conspiracy to throw out the British. But on enquiry it was found baseless and a person Khalil who was responsible for rumour was arrested and sentenced. In 1914–15, the city came into prominence as a centre of revolutionary activity when Gendalal Dixit, a teacher at Auraiya nearby town, formed the Shivaji Samitti with object of liberating the country. Gendalal Dixit had also organized a group of young men called ‘Matri-Vedi’.

In 1920 Mahatma Gandhi launched his non-cooperation movement all over the country. In Etawah, the response of the people to this movement was enthusiastic and wide spread. In 1920–21, the district congress committee was formed with Maulana Rahamat Ullah as its president. In 1925, Jyoti Shankar Dixit of Etawah was arrested in connection with the Kakori conspiracy case but later released. In 1928, boycott of the Simon Commission; followed by; the civil disobedience movement in 1930 and Quit India Movement 1942 were started in Etawah, as in other parts of the country.

After Independence of India till January, 1974, 548 freedom fighters were awarded Tamra Patras, i.e. copper plates containing a record of the services rendered by them or their forebears.

Municipal Council, Etawah
Municipal Council, Etawah was founded through Notificatin-332 date 11 July 1884 on 16 August 1884. At that time district was divided into 10 wards.Now it has 36 wards . The chairman is Noshaba Khanam Furqan with Executive Officer Shri Anil Kumar .

Climate

Communal Clashes
In 1885 when Dussehra and Muharram coincided, communal disturbances broke out between the Hindus and the Muslims.

Politics 
Until the 1980s, the regional politics was largely dominated by the Congress. The region saw several changes in the succeeding decades which led to a reconfiguration of political power. Until the 80s the upper castes often used coercion to get votes from the lower caste majority in the region. The lower castes began to assert themselves much more forcefully. Two leaders, Chaudhary Charan Singh, a Jat leader who briefly became prime minister in 1979, and Mulayam Singh Yadav became faces for opposition to the Congress. Moreover, dacoits from backward castes strengthened, asserting control over land and political power.

Economy

Manufacturing (Industries) Share in GDP
Manufacturing accounted for 22142 lakhs at Current Prices (2015–16), 19646 Lakhs at Constant Price (2011–12

Transport

Air
City is served by Saifai Domestic Airport, which is around 15 km from city center. The airport has only unscheduled chartered flights. The nearest domestic airport is at Ganesh Shankar Vidyarthi Airport which is 175 km. The nearest International Airport is Chaudhary Charan Singh International Airport located at a distance of around 220 km.

Rail

Etawah Junction railway station is the main station of the city as well as of the Howrah-Delhi main line and Guna - Etawah Rail Line . It is a class A station of Allahabad division of North Central Railways. It has a secondary railway line to Agra via reserved sanctuary area. Etawah - Mainpuri line is also constructed and train is running between Etawah and Mainpuri. One another railway line from Etawah to Bindki is to be constructed. It has halt for fastest trains like Kanpur New Delhi Shatabdi Express, Lucknow Swarna Shatabdi Express and many more. Etawah Junction is one of the cleanest railway station of Indian Railways. Necessary basic amenities like water taps, pay and use toilets, foot over bridges, platform shed, waiting hall, railway enquiry window, computerized reservation hall, ATMs, food stalls, integrated train information system, train announcement system, train display boards, platform - coach indicators, infotainment screens, wheelchair accessible ramp can be found at station. Sooner, we will find escalators to the bridge at the station. The city is also served by four other railway stations viz. Udi Junction, Sarai Bhopat, Ekdil and Vaidhpura.

Road
Etawah is well-connected by roads with the rest of Uttar Pradesh state. Etawah is the regional office of Etawah Region of UP Roadways. It has buses for all cities of Uttar Pradesh as well as for all neighbouring states. It has buses to Delhi for every 15 minutes. National Highway 19 passes through Etawah, connecting it to important cities like Delhi, Mathura, Agra, Kanpur, Allahabad, Varanasi, Gurugram, Dhanbad and Kolkata. There are three big cities namely Gwalior, Agra and Kanpur, near Etawah with well connected roads.

Agra Lucknow Expressway have various cuts, from where roads connect it to city like with Farrukhabad Road near Baralokpur, with Etawah - Mainpuri State Highway near Karhal, with NH 19 near Bhadan.

Within the city, auto-rickshaw and cycle rickshaw are the major forms of transport. Bus services run at high frequencies. Etawah city is waiting for city bus services as it was announced by UPA government to run 85 city buses to connect the city and to develop a ring road around the city. City buses will be available from Sai City Udaypur in North to Udi More in South, from Sarai Bhopat in the west to Pilkhar in the east. It will cover 50 km (approx.) distance if starts.

Education

Colleges

Chandra Shekhar Azad University of Agriculture and Technology, based in Kanpur has a campus in Etawah, established in 1994–95.
Chaudhary Charan Singh Post Graduate College is offers undergraduate and post-graduate courses in Science, Arts, Commerce faculties. The college is affiliated to Chhatrapati Shahu Ji Maharaj University.
 College of Dairy Technology, Etawah, established in 2015 is a constituent college and faculty of Kanpur's Chandra Shekhar Azad University of Agriculture and Technology.
 College of Fisheries Science and Research Centre, Etawah, established in 2015, is a constituent college and faculty of Kanpur's Chandra Shekhar Azad University of Agriculture and Technology.
Government Girls Post Graduate College, Etawah is government women's college offering BA, BCom and MA (Hindi, Sociology & Economics) courses in Etawah. The college is affiliated to Chhatrapati Shahu Ji Maharaj University.
Karm Kshetra Post Graduate College is a college offering undergraduate and post-graduate courses in Science, Arts, Commerce faculties. The college is affiliated to Chhatrapati Shahu Ji Maharaj University
 District Institute of Education and Training, Etawah is a B.T.C. training college. It offers 2-year B.T.C. which is also known as Diploma in Elementary Education (D.El.Ed.) outside of Uttar Pradesh.

Schools
 
 Archana Memorial SGM Inter College, Affiliated by Board Of High School and Intermediate Education, Uttar Pradesh Etawah .
 Arya Kenya Inter college, Etawah, Affiliated by Board Of High School and Intermediate Education, Uttar Pradesh, near Naurangabaad crossing, Etawah.
 Delhi Public School, Etawah, NH 19, Etawah.
 Epsilon Institute of Mathematics, Saifai Road, Etawah
 Government girls inter college, Etawah, Affiliated by Board Of High School and Intermediate Education, Uttar Pradesh, Idgaah  road, Etawah.
 Government Inter College, Etawah (since 1918), Affiliated by Board Of High School and Intermediate Education, Uttar Pradesh, station road, Etawah.
 Gyan Sthali Academy, Katra Shamsher, Etawah .
 Gyan Sthali Residential School, [CBSE] NH-2, Sarai Jalal, Etawah.
 H. M. S Islamia Inter College is one of the oldest schools of the city affiliated to Board of Secondary Education, Uttar Pradesh.
 Jawahar Navodaya Vidyalaya, Samhon, Etawah
 Kendriya Vidyalaya, Etawah.
 Mount Litera Zee School, Farrukhabad Road, Sai City Udaypur, Etawah
 Saraswati Vidya Mandir, Etawah
 Seven Hills, Ekta Colony, Etawah
 Shakuntlam International School, Agra-Bah road, Udi Mod, Etawah.
 St. Mary's Inter College, Etawah is an English medium School affiliated to CBSE, New Delhi and NCERT published books onwards. It has run for over 50 years.
 St. Vivekanand Senior Secondary Public School, Alampur Hauz, Agra Road, Etawah is a residential cum day scholar English medium school affiliated to CBSE. The school is under Sir Madanlal Group of Institutions (SMGI).
 Suditi Global Academy, Nagla Lallu, Phulrai, Post Dhanua, Jaswantnagar, Etawah The school is affiliated to CBSE
 Suditi Global Academy, Vicharpur, NH 19, Etawah
 Theosophical Inter College, S.D. Field, Etawah

Places of interest
Bhareh ka Qila, Boddh Sculptures, Bais Khwaja, National Chambal Sanctuary, Tixi Temple, Jains Temple, Nilkanth Temple, Kaaliwahan Temple, St. Mary Church, Company Bagh Garden, St. Mary Garden

Etawah Safari Park

The uniqueness of Etawah Safari Park lies in the fact that while at other such places the animals remain caged and the tourists move freely in the area. While in Etawah Lion Safari, people will move in caged paths while the lions and other animals are seen moving freely in the jungle. The Lion Safari, which is mainly being developed to provide an alternate home to Asiatic lions, that are now limited only to Gir Forests in Gujarat will also feature a Lion Breeding Centre.

National Chambal Sanctuary
National Chambal Sanctuary is spread over the Agra and Etawah districts, and a total of 290 different species of migratory and resident birds have been identified in the region so far. Winter is the best time to visit the sanctuary. A boat ride in its tranquil waters during this time is an exhilarating experience with spectacular sightings of the big reptiles basking along the 180 km sparkling sand stretches in the morning sun. But the main draw of the sanctuary are the flamingoes that arrive here in November and stay until May. The Rudy Shelduck also arrives a little earlier in September and stays here until May. The Indian Skimmers have huge colonies in the sanctuary and breed prolifically here.

Sarsai Nawar Wetland
Sarsai Nawar Wetland is a Ramsar enlisted site wetland, en route to Saman Wildlife Sanctuary, in Etawah District of Uttar Pradesh. It comprises two small lakes that attract Sarus Cranes, White Ibis and other water birds in large numbers. It has a large population of the threatened species of Sarus Cranes, the world's tallest flying birds. Ten Sarus Crane pairs breed here regularly, which is more than twice the number of breeding pairs in the bird sanctuary of Bharatpur in Rajasthan. In winters, almost more than 40,000 migratory birds from northern arc visit Sarsai Nawar wetland.

Agra-Etawah Cycle Highway

Agra-Etawah Cycle Highway in Uttar Pradesh now has Asia's first cycle highway. A first-of-its-kind project, the 207-km-long cycle highway runs between Etawah and Agra and was declared open on Saturday, 27 November 2016. The track begins from the lion safari in Etawah. On its way to Agra are tourist destinations like Naugava ka Quila, Raja Bhoj ki Haveli, and Bateshwarnath Temple. It ends at the eastern gate of the Taj Mahal in Agra.

Notable Buildings

Religious

 Hajari Mahadev Temple Sarsai Nawar
 Kundeshwar Mahadev Temple, Agra-Bah road, Udi Mod, Etawah
Kali Vahan Mandir, Gwalior Road Etawah
 Neel Kanth Mahadev Mandir (Lord Shiva Temple)
 Maa Kalika Devi Mandir, Lakhna, Etawah 
 Pachnada, Etawah
 Shahi Jama Masjid
 Sai Mandir
 Tixi Temple Etawah
 Pilua Mahavir
 Brahmani Devi
 Pili Kothi
 Nasia Ji Digambar Jain Temple
 Bharehshwar Mahadev Mandir, Bhareh

Notable people

 
 
K. Asif, film director was born in Etawah
Pia Bajpiee, actress born in Etawah
Sarita Bhadauria, MLA from Etawah
Ghulam Mustafa Burdwani, former Mufti of Etawah
Babu Gulabrai, a significant figure in modern Hindi literature was born in Etawah
Allan Octavian Hume, the founder of Indian National Congress was district collector in 1857 *Dr. Zakir Hussain, President of India completed his high school in Etawah
C. K. Jain, former Secretary-General was born in Etawah
Premdas Katheria, former MP from Etawah 
Ram Shankar Katheria, MP from Etawah
Mohsin-ul-Mulk, prominent in Aligarh Movement
Raghuraj Singh Shakya, former MLA of Etawah
Ram Singh Shakya, former MP of Etawah
Akshay Yadav, former MP born In Etawah

References

External links

 Website of Etawah District
 Local Directory of Etawah District
 A zoomable driving map

 
Cities in Uttar Pradesh
Tourism in Uttar Pradesh